Daniel Nestor and Nenad Zimonjić were the defending champions, but lost to Mahesh Bhupathi and Max Mirnyi in the quarterfinals.
Bhupathi and Mirnyi won this tournament, by defeating Mark Knowles and Andy Ram 7–5, 7–5 in the final.

Seeds
All seeds received a bye into the second round.

Draw

Finals

Top half

Bottom half

External links
Draw

Bnp Paribas Masters - Doubles
Doubles